Khan Bahadur Ataullah Khan Tarar was the elected Muslim member of the Council of State from the undivided Punjab in fourth council of state.

References 

Punjabi people
Punjabi politicians
Year of birth missing (living people)
Place of birth missing (living people)
Living people
Members of the Council of State (India)